Storytone is the 34th studio album by Canadian musician Neil Young, released on November 4, 2014 on Reprise Records. The album was released in two formats: a single disc, which features orchestral and big band arrangements of the songs, and a deluxe edition which includes stripped-back recordings of the songs. Young subsequently released a third version of the album, Mixed Pages of Storytone, merging elements of both, later in the year.

Storytone is the second studio album Neil Young released in 2014, following the predominantly lo-fi release A Letter Home.

Background
In March 2014, Neil Young expressed interest in recording an album alongside an orchestra, stating: "I'd like to make a record with a full-blown orchestra, live – a mono recording with one mic. I want to do something like that where we really record what happened, with one point of view and the musicians moved closer and farther away, the way it was done in the past. To me that's a challenge and it's a sound that's unbelievable, and you can't get it any other way."

During Neil Young and Crazy Horse's summer tour, the band performed a new track, entitled "Who's Gonna Stand Up?", which subsequently appeared on the album, without Crazy Horse.

Recording
Writing on his official website, Young detailed the recording of the two versions of Storytone: "First, I recorded the songs at Capitol Records with my old friends Niko Bolas and Al Schmitt. I sang them alone with only the instruments I desired to use. There was no over dubbing or enhancing. The resulting music is from my heart, directly to you. Then, I entered the hallowed MGM sound stage where The Wizard of Oz soundtrack was recorded. Surrounded by the finest musicians in Hollywood, with arrangements and orchestrations by Christ Walden and Michael Bearden, I sang seven of the Storytone songs live for the second time. I sang into Barbra Streisand's microphone, a perfectly cared-for antique with a wonderful tone that I loved. I also went to Sunset Boulevard to record the remaining three songs with a big band in an old Hollywood studio rebuilt and now known as East West. All the performances are live with no added effects or recording. I just stood singing into the microphone with occasional harmonica notes blown in between verses, while the musicians played."

Writing and composition
Many of the album's tracks were inspired by Young's burgeoning romance with actress Daryl Hannah, and his divorce from his wife of thirty-six years, Pegi Young. Regarding the tracks, Young stated: "These songs were written during a period of profound change in my life. Everything I want to share is there."

Commercial and critical performance
The album debuted at No. 33 on Billboard 200, No. 2 on Folk Albums,  and No. 4 on Top Rock Albums,  selling 10,768 copies in its first week.  It has sold 40,000 copies in the US as of June 2015.

The album has a 60 out of 100 Metascore from Metacritic, indicating "Mixed or average reviews". Robert Christgau suggested in 2018 that he appreciated the album and may have underrated it at the time of its release, writing it "showed up in my Neither file, which these days is kind of an honor, because I seldom add to it now that I don't feel obliged to nail down every possible Honorable Mention."

Track listing 
All songs written and composed by Neil Young.

Charts

References

Neil Young albums
2014 albums
Reprise Records albums
Rock-and-roll albums
Symphonic rock albums

Albums recorded at Capitol Studios